This list contains songs written by South Korean  composer Kenzie, including those where she is credited as co-author.

Songs

References 

Lists of songs by songwriters